Next Time West Coast is an album by the band Further released in 1995.

Track listing 

 Be That As It May    
 Victim Rock    
 Grandview Skyline    
 Badgers (Part II)    
 Friends And Enemies    
 Stranger Than Silver    
 You're Just Dead Skin To Me (Written by Primal Scream)
 Way Too Much

References

1995 albums